Mob Rules may refer to:
Mob Rules (band), a German power metal band
Mob Rules (album), an album by Black Sabbath
"Mob Rules" (House episode)

See also
 Mob Rule (disambiguation)